The 1924 Kansas City Blues season was their inaugural season in the National Football League. The team finished 2–7, and finished fifteenth in the league.

Schedule

Standings

References

Kansas City Cowboys seasons
Kansas City Cowboys
Kansas City